Shenik, is a village in the Armavir Province of Armenia. It was founded in 1969 in the southwestern part of Armavir Province, at an area was once closed to foreigners.

See also 
Armavir Province

References 

Populated places in Armavir Province
Populated places established in 1971
Cities and towns built in the Soviet Union
1971 establishments in the Soviet Union
Yazidi populated places in Armenia